An Inconvenient Truth: The Planetary Emergency of Global Warming and What We Can Do About It is a 2006 book by Al Gore released in conjunction with the film An Inconvenient Truth. It is published by Rodale Press in Emmaus, Pennsylvania, in the United States.

The sequel is Our Choice: A Plan to Solve the Climate Crisis (2009).

Summary 
Based on Gore's lecture tour on the topic of global warming this book elaborates upon points offered in the film. The publisher of the text states that the book, "brings together leading-edge research from top scientists around the world; photographs, charts, and other illustrations; and personal anecdotes and observations to document the fast pace and wide scope of global warming."

In a section called "The Politicization of Global Warming", Al Gore stated:

As for why so many people still resist what the facts clearly show, I think, in part, the reason is that the truth about the climate crisis is an inconvenient one that means we are going to have to change the way we live our lives.

The second part of the statement beginning "... the reason is that the truth about the climate crisis..." was also highlighted and separated from the main writing in that section.

Reception 
Michiko Kakutani argues in The New York Times that the book's "roots as a slide show are very much in evidence. It does not pretend to grapple with climate change with the sort of minute detail and analysis" given by other books on the topic "and yet as a user-friendly introduction to global warming and a succinct summary of many of the central arguments laid out in those other volumes, "An Inconvenient Truth" is lucid, harrowing and bluntly effective."

In 2009, the audiobook version, narrated by Beau Bridges, Cynthia Nixon, and Blair Underwood, won the Grammy Award for Best Spoken Word Album.

References

External links

 OnTheIssues.org's book review and excerpts

2006 in the environment
2006 non-fiction books
Books by Al Gore
Climate change books
Grammy Award for Best Spoken Word Album
Rodale, Inc. books